Fishman may refer to:

 Fishman (company)
 Fishman (surname)
 Fishman (wrestler) (1951–2017), ring name of luchador José Nájera
 Fish-man, in Spanish mythology
 Fishman (The Legend of Zelda), a character in the Zelda video game The Wind Waker

See also
 Fishmans, a Japanese dub band